Ante Juric (born 11 November 1973) is an Australian football manager and former professional player. He was recently the Matildas assistant coach (201-15), the Australian under-17s and 19s women's national coach (2014–16) and was the Assistant national technical director (2013-2016) for the Football Federation AUs. He is currently the head coach for Sydney FC in the A-League Women competition.

Playing career
Ante Juric, born in Canberra in 1973, has arguably been one of Australia's most cultured defenders produced in Australia. He played professionally for 13 years and has represented Australia as a Socceroo, Olyroo and Young Socceroo where the team finished fourth in the World Youth Cup of 1993. However Juric, with all his natural talent surprisingly did not play a huge part for the national team and indeed represented his country late in his career. In fact, it was after he produced a heroic performance in the 2002 National Soccer League Grand Final win over Perth Glory, playing with a dislocated elbow that he finally received his senior cap that same year. In an era of Australian football where talent was overlooked for brawn and fitness, Juric was unlucky to miss the recent Dutch and technical influence in the game which would no doubt have highlighted his talents on the world stage.

Juric learnt his trade at one of Australia's great junior nursery's Canberra Croatia/Deakin/FC. The club has produced the likes of Ned Zelic, Josip Simunic and George Kulscar. From here he went on to represent Australia at the World Youth Cup in 1993, culminating in a 4th-place finish, losing to eventual champions Brazil.

Juric went on to have a successful National Soccer League career playing for the Melbourne Knights, Sydney Olympic/Sharks and the Canberra Cosmos, playing over 200 games and scoring over 20 goals and winning premierships and championships.

Juric in his twilight years has played in the NSW Premier League winning a title with Sydney United in the NSWPL.

In 2009 Juric was inducted into the ACT Sports Hall of Fame for his Football exploits and additionally in the same year he was inducted into the Capital Football Hall of Fame.

Managerial career
Juric is currently embarking on a coaching career, currently coaching Sydney olympic in the NSWNPL and Sydney FC Womens in the W-League.

Juric was a former Women's U19 and Women's U17 national Australian coach and also the NSWIS Football men's coach.

In June 2017, Juric was appointed head coach of Sydney FC's women's team.

In 2020, Juric was appointed head coach of Sydney Olympic FC.

Career statistics

International
Source:

References

External links
 Oz Football profile
 

1973 births
Living people
Association football defenders
Australian soccer players
Australian expatriate soccer players
Australia international soccer players
Australia under-20 international soccer players
National Soccer League (Australia) players
APIA Leichhardt FC players
Canberra Cosmos FC players
Melbourne Knights FC players
Molde FK players
Sydney Olympic FC players
Sydney United 58 FC players
Eliteserien players
Australian people of Croatian descent
Expatriate footballers in Malaysia
Expatriate footballers in Norway
Expatriate footballers in Portugal
Australian expatriate sportspeople in Malaysia
Australian expatriate sportspeople in Norway
Australian expatriate sportspeople in Portugal
Sport Benfica e Castelo Branco players
Fraser Park FC players
Sydney Olympic FC managers
2002 OFC Nations Cup players
Australian soccer coaches